Krystyna is a Polish variant of name Christine or Christina. 

It may refer to:

People with the name
Krystyna Chojnowska-Liskiewicz (born 1936), Polish naval engineer and sailor
Krystyna Janda (born 1952), Polish actress
Krystyna Kuperberg (born 1944), Polish-American mathematician
Krystyna Liberda (born 1968), Polish biathlete
Krystyna Nadolna (born 1949), Polish Olympic athlete
Krystyna Nowakowska (1935–2019), Polish Olympic athlete
Krystyna Radziwiłł (1560-1580), Polish noblewoman 
Krystyna Skarbek (1915-1952), Polish-born British agent in World War II
Halszka Wasilewska; Polish partisan who used the nom-de-guerre "Krystyna" in WWI

Places
Krystyna, Masovian Voivodeship (east-central Poland)

Polish feminine given names